John Reynor (born 25 July 1964 in Dublin) was an Irish soccer player during the 1980s.

He represented Bohemians, Monaghan United, Kilkenny City amongst others during his career. He made 3 appearances for Bohs in European competition.

He was Player of the Month for December 1987.

Reynor played for the Republic of Ireland national under-19 football team in the 1982 UEFA European Under-18 Football Championship finals in Finland. In April 1983 he played for the League of Ireland XI U21s against their Italian League counterparts who included Roberto Mancini and Gianluca Vialli in their team.

His son Darragh is also a footballer. He also has two daughters and another son.

References

Republic of Ireland association footballers
Republic of Ireland youth international footballers
League of Ireland XI players
Association football midfielders
League of Ireland players
Bohemian F.C. players
Shamrock Rovers F.C. players
Monaghan United F.C. players
Kilkenny City A.F.C. players
1964 births
Living people
Association footballers from County Dublin